Alin Robert Rațiu (born 14 September 1982 in Bucharest) is a Romanian former football player, who played as a defender.

External links

1982 births
Living people
Romanian footballers
Association football defenders
Footballers from Bucharest
Liga I players
FC Sportul Studențesc București players
FC Politehnica Timișoara players
FC Gloria Buzău players
FC Internațional Curtea de Argeș players
FC Universitatea Cluj players
Liga II players
LPS HD Clinceni players